Derrick Harris (born November 4, 1969), better known by his stage name True Master, is an American hip-hop record producer and occasional rapper, known for his affiliation with the Wu-Tang Clan.

Production credits

1995
Guru presents Ill Kid Records (1995)
07. True Master - "Who's the Truest"
09. Fabidden - "Hi Energy"

1995
Ol' Dirty Bastard - Return to the 36 Chambers: The Dirty Version (March 28, 1995)
04. "Brooklyn Zoo" (Co-produced with DivineMaster Wu-Elements and Ol' Dirty Bastard)
Guru - Jazzmatazz, Vol. 2: The New Reality (July 18, 1995)
04. Looking Through Darkness (featuring Mica Paris) (Produced by True Master and co-produced by Guru)
05.  Medicine (featuring True Master and Ini Kamoze)

1996
Ghostface Killah - Ironman (October 29, 1996)
09. "Fish" (featuring Cappadonna and Raekwon)
Various artists - NFL Jams (Import) (November 26, 1996)
04. Method Man and Ricky Watters - "It's In The Game"

1997
Various artists - Rhyme & Reason (soundtrack) (January 14, 1997)
07. The RZA - "Tragedy" (Produced by True Master and co-produced by RZA)
Wu-Tang Clan - Wu-Tang Forever (June 3, 1997)
2-09. "The M.G.M."
2-13. "Heaterz" (featuring Cappadonna)
Gravediggaz - The Pick, the Sickle and the Shovel (October 14, 1997)
03. "Da Bomb"
08. "Pit of Snakes" (Produced by True Master and co-produced by RZA)
12. "Hidden Emotions" (featuring True Master)

1998
Cappadonna - The Pillage (March 24, 1998)
01. "Slang Editorial"
05. "Supa Ninjaz" (featuring U-God and Method Man)
07. "Splish Splash"
09. "Milk the Cow" (featuring Method Man)
10. "South of the Border"
12. "Dart Throwing" (featuring Raekwon and Method Man)
Killah Priest - Heavy Mental (May 10, 1998)
02. "One Step" (featuring Tekitha)
05. "Cross My Heart" (featuring Inspectah Deck and GZA)
11. "If You Don't Know" (featuring Ol' Dirty Bastard)
Sunz of Man - The Last Shall Be First (July 21, 1998)
04. "Flaming Swords"
11. "Collaboration '98" (featuring True Master and Method Man)
14. "For The Lust of Money/The Grandz"
17. "Next Up" (featuring Method Man)
18. "Intellectuals" (featuring Raekwon and U-God)
Method Man - Tical 2000: Judgement Day (November 17, 1998)
04. "Dangerous Grounds" (featuring Street Life)
06. "Sweet Love" (featuring Cappadonna and Street Life)
08. "Torture"
16. "Party Crasher" 
The version of this song that appears on the album is actually a remix by RZA. True Master provided the original beat, but it was later replaced. In an interview, Method Man expressed his wish to have the album released with the original True Master beat once all the copies of the first retail pressings were sold. The full instrumental of the original version of "Party Crasher" is available on a white label release of instrumentals from Tical 2000: Judgement Day.
17. "Grid Iron Rap" (featuring Street Life)
23. "Killin' Fields" (featuring Cho-Flo)

1999
Ol' Dirty Bastard - Nigga Please (September 14, 1999)
12. "All In Together Now"
Inspectah Deck - Uncontrolled Substance (October 5, 1999)
08. "Longevity" (featuring U-God)
11. "Lovin' You" (featuring La the Darkman)
13. "R.E.C. Room"
U-God - Golden Arms Redemption (October 5, 1999)
02. "Turbulence"
04. "Dat's Gangsta"

2000
Tony Touch - The Piece Maker (April 18, 2000)
05. Wu-Tang Clan - "The Abduction"
Afu-Ra - Body of the Life Force (October 10, 2000)
04. "Big Acts, Little Acts" (featuring GZA)

2001
Various artists - Oz (soundtrack) (January 9, 2001)
03. Wu-Tang Clan - "What You In Fo'"
Cappadonna - The Yin and the Yang (April 3, 2001)
02. "Super Model" (featuring Ghostface Killah)
Gravediggaz - Nightmare in A-Minor (April 9, 2002)
03. "Burn Baby Burn"
14. "Man Only Fears" (featuring ShoGun Assasson)
19. "Nightmare In A-Minor" (featuring 4th Disciple and Beretta 9)
Various artists - Wu-Chronicles, Chapter 2
08. Inspectah Deck, Leatha Face and U-God - "Rumble"
10. Leatha Face and U-God - "To The Rescue"
RZA - Digital Bullet (August 28, 2001)
09. "La Rhumba" (featuring Method Man, Killa Sin and Beretta 9)
Wu-Tang Clan - Iron Flag (December 18, 2001)
07. "Ya'll Been Warned"

2002
Afu-Ra - Life Force Radio (May 21, 2002)
16. "Dangerous Language" (featuring RZA)
Busta Rhymes - It Ain't Safe No More (November 26, 2002)
18. "Till It's Gone"

2003
9th Prince - Granddaddy Flow (May 28, 2003)
11. "Slang Killaz" (featuring Killarmy)
RZA - Birth of a Prince (October 7, 2003)
05. "Fast Cars" (featuring Ghostface Killah)

2004
Ghostface Killah - The Pretty Toney Album (January 25, 2004)
02. "Biscuits" (featuring Trife)
Masta Killa - No Said Date (June 6, 2004)
09. "Secret Rivals" (featuring Killah Priest and Method Man)
13. "Queen"
15. "Silverbacks" (featuring Inspectah Deck and GZA)

2005
Black Rob - The Black Rob Report (October 18, 2005)
12. "You Know What" (featuring Louis Farrakhan)

2007
Cilvaringz - I
12. "Damascus"

2008
GZA - Pro Tools
3. "Alphabets"
9. "Paper Plates"
This track was wrongfully credited to The RZA, but was confirmed being produced by True Master.

2009
Raekwon - Only Built 4 Cuban Linx… Pt. II
17. "Fat Lady Sings"
This track was wrongfully credited to The RZA, but was confirmed being produced by True Master.

2010
KRS-One & True Master - Meta-Historical
entire album

9th Prince - One Man Army
 13. "Prince Of The Empire State"

2013
 Killah Priest - The Psychic World Of Walter Reed
DISC 2
 01. "The PWOWR (Problem Solver)" [co-produced by GZA & Shaolin Monks]

2017
 Masta Killa - Loyalty Is Royalty
 08. "Skit"
2021
Killah Priest & True Master - Divine Intervention
entire album

Appearances as a rapper

1993
Guru presents Ill Kid Records (1993)
07. True Master - "Who's the Truest"

1995
Guru - Jazzmatazz, Vol. 2: The New Reality (July 18, 1995)
08. "Medicine" (featuring Ini Kamoze and True Master)

1997
Gravediggaz - The Pick, the Sickle and the Shovel October 14, 1997
12. "Hidden Emotions" (featuring True Master)

1998
Sunz of Man - The Last Shall Be First July 21, 1998
11. "Collaboration '98" (featuring True Master and The Method Man)

2000
Royal Fam - Yesterday, Today, Iz Tomorrow 2000
11. "Army Brickaid" (featuring Jahrule, ROC, Timbo King and True Master)

2006
RZA - Afro Samurai OST
15. "Take Sword Part II" (featuring 60 Second Assassin)

2008
GZA - Pro Tools
10. "Columbian Ties" (featuring True Master)

2010
KRS-One & True Master - Meta-Historical
07. "Knowledge Reigns Supreme" (featuring True Master)
19. "He's Us" (featuring True Master)
2021
Killah Priest & True Master - Divine Intervention
02. "Summer Snow" (featuring True Master)
04. "Asiatic Nobles" (featuring True Master)
05. "Cathedrals" (featuring True Master)

08. "Akashic Headress" (featuring True Master)

09. "Venus Succubus" (featuring True Master)

References

External links 
True Master on Discogs
True Master profile at Wu-Tang Corp
True Master on Myspace

 

Living people
American hip hop record producers
Record producers from New York (state)
Five percenters
Wu-Tang Clan affiliates
1969 births
Gang Starr Foundation members